Leonardo Jesús Hernández (born November 6, 1959), commonly known as Leo Hernandez (er-NAN-dez), is a former Major League Baseball third baseman and right-handed batter who played for the Baltimore Orioles (1982–83, 1985) and New York Yankees (1986). He is currently the hitting coach for DSL Mets1.

A native of Santa Lucía, Miranda State, Venezuela, Hernández was signed as an amateur free agent by the Los Angeles Dodgers in 1978 and made his debut with Baltimore on September 19, 1982.

In four-season career, Hernández hit .226 with seven home runs and 30 RBI in 85 games.

Hernandez was named as the hitting coach for the DSL Mets 1 of the New York Mets organization for the 2018 season.

See also
 List of players from Venezuela in Major League Baseball

References

External links
, or Retrosheet
Venezuelan Professional Baseball League statistics

1959 births
Alacranes de Campeche players
Algodoneros de Unión Laguna players
Baltimore Orioles players
Caribes de Oriente players
Charlotte O's players
Clinton Dodgers players
Columbus Clippers players
El Paso Diablos players
Leones del Caracas players
Leones de Yucatán players
Living people
Lodi Dodgers players
Major League Baseball players from Venezuela
Major League Baseball third basemen
Mexican League baseball players
Minor league baseball coaches
New York Yankees players
People from Miranda (state)
Rochester Red Wings players
San Antonio Dodgers players
Tigres de Aragua players
Venezuelan baseball coaches
Venezuelan expatriate baseball players in Mexico
Venezuelan expatriate baseball players in the United States
Vero Beach Dodgers players